Khaldoon Fuad Gharaibeh (17 October 1968– in Amman, Jordan) is a Jordanian cartoonist and a caricature artist, .

Memberships 
 Consultancy Commission of the Arab Cartoon Encyclopedia, Damascus, Syria
 Judges panel of the Young Artist Competition (Jordanian Press Establishment), Amman, Jordan
 Judges panel of Hatem children's magazine, Amman, Jordan
 Judges panel of Naji Al Ali competition, Damascus, Syria

Work 
 Al Ra'i, Amman, Jordan, 2000–2005 and from 2006-Now
 Kuwaiti “Al Jareeda” Newspaper, Al Kuwait, Kuwait, 2007–2010
 “Al Rai Al Akhar” Lebanese Magazine, Beirut, Lebanon, 2006–2009
 Al Bayan, Dubai, UAE. 2005–2006
 Al-Arab al Yoam Daily, Amman, Jordan, 1997–2000
 Al Mashreq Al-Elami, of the Arabian International Journalism Studies Centre, Amman, Jordan, 1997–2002 (discontinued)
 Al-Muharrer weekly (Arabic and French editions, Paris, France, 1994-until the magazine stopped
 Shihan weekly, Amman, Jordan, 1993–2000
 Al Majd, Amman, Jordan, 1992–1994
 Akher Khabar, Amman, Jordan, 1992–1994
 Al Ufuq, Amman, Jordan, 1991 until the magazine stopped
 In addition to other Jordanian weeklies, including: Al Bilad, Al Mustakbal, Al Diar, Al Ahali, Al Jamaheer, Nida Al Watan, As well as other newspapers and magazines, such as, Lebanese Assafir and Al Nahar, Iranian Al Subh, and several websites such as: irancartoon, fotosay, cartoonbank, St-Just, Al Rai Daily Newspaper and official TV interviews

Technical Manager 
 Al-Mithaq Newspaper, Jordan, 1997–1998
 Al Muqatabas Al Eilami, 2000–2002

Correspondent 
 Correspondent for the Lebanese daily As-Safir, 1995–1997

Published works
 Draw Human Rights for Me, a collection of cartoons of 58 international cartoonists, published in Switzerland by the UNESCO in 1998, on the occasion of the 50th anniversary of the Universal Declaration of Human Rights
 The Media and Freedom of Press, a collection of cartoons published by the Arab and World Center for Press Studies Amman, in cooperation with ARTICLE 19 Journalists Rights Group
 The Arab Encyclopedia of Cartoons, First Edition, Damascus 1999
 The Arab Encyclopedia of Cartoons, Second Edition, Damascus 2000
 Under Print Books
 Ramadi Ala Rasasi
 Iza ba'ad fe Majal
 Al Wuqof fe Al Haraka

Other works 
 Caricature works were used in a graduation research in Tunisia, University of Manuba, Institute of Journalism and News Sciences, supervised by Dr. Sabah Al Mahmoudi, 2003
 Participation with cartoons in children's movie "Maharim-Maharim" directed by Mohammad Malas and produced by Al Jazeera channel 2008

Personal exhibitions 
 Yarmouk University, Irbid, 1994, 1995, 1996
 Unions & Professional Associations Centre, Amman & Irbid, 1996, 1998 and 1999
 Irbid National University, Irbid, 1997
 Press Club, Dubai, UAE 2005
 Istanbul, Turkey 2009
 Bari, Italy 2010

Joint exhibitions 
 Fuhais Festival 1996, with other Jordanian artists
 The Arab Cartoonist Exhibition Amman 1996, with Ali Farzat, Bahgouri, Hijazi, Bahgat Othman, Yousef Abdelky, Mustafa Hussain, Jalal Al Rifai, Abdul Hadi Al Shammaa and Abdulla Al Muharraki
 "No to Normalization" Exhibition, Sanna, Yemen 1996, with Yousef Abdelky, Khudair Al Humairi, Amro Saleem, Hijazi, Jumaa and Bahgat Othman
 Draw Human Rights For me, exhibition – Geneva, 1998 with 58 world artists
 The First International Forum For Caricature, Dubai, UAE 2000
 Saloon International Exhibition, Saint Just Le Martel, France 2001, 2002 and 2004
 Cartoon Exhibition, Tokyo, Japan 2003
 Holocaust Exhibition, Tehran Iran 2006
 Syrian Exhibition Fair, Damascus, Syria 2007
 From Port to Ports Exhibition, Bari, Italy 2010

Awards 
 Special Prize, Syrian Exhibition Fair, Competition entitled (The Play), Damascus, Syria 2007
 Special Prize, Syrian Exhibition Fair, Competition entitled (The Pens), Damascus, Syria 2008
 Bari Fair Prize, Bari, Italy 2010

Design 
 Company logos
 Book covers and posters
 Advertisement designs

References

Personal Websites 
gharaibehweb.com
kaldooncartoon.com

1968 births
Jordanian cartoonists
Jordanian caricaturists
Living people